Mario  Norberto Chaldú (6 June 1942 – 1 April 2020) was an Argentine football forward who played for Argentina in the 1966 FIFA World Cup. He also played for CA Banfield, San Lorenzo de Almagro, Racing Club and Kimberley in the Argentinian League system.

Chaldú died on 1 April 2020, in a Monte Grande clinic after a prolonged illness.

References

External links
FIFA profile

1942 births
2020 deaths
Argentine footballers
Argentina international footballers
Association football forwards
San Lorenzo de Almagro footballers
1966 FIFA World Cup players
Footballers from Buenos Aires